The Alexander Strider was a single-decker bus body produced in Scotland by Walter Alexander Coachbuilders between 1993 and 1997. The body was available on Dennis Lance, Volvo B10B, Volvo B10M and Scania L113 chassis. In 1993, the body was modified briefly to fit the Mercedes-Benz O405/O405G chassis and was marketed as the Alexander Cityrider. Only two were built on this chassis configuration.

A common feature of the bus that it has either a single-curvature windscreen or a double-curvature windscreen with a rounded roof dome and a separately mounted destination display.

References

External links

Strider
Single-deck buses
Step-entrance buses
Vehicles introduced in 1993